Daniel Blatman is an Israeli historian, specializing in history of the Holocaust. Blatman is the head of the Institute for Contemporary Jewry at the Hebrew University of Jerusalem.

Blatman was a visiting scholar at the Centre for European Studies at Harvard University, 2012–13.

Books
The Death Marches. The Final Phase of Nazi Genocide, Cambridge Mass. and London: Harvard University Press, 2011

Prizes
1991: The Pridan Prize for Studies in East European Jewish History, Hebrew University
1993: Jakob Buchman Prize for the Memory of the Holocaust
2011: Yad Vashem International Book Prize for Holocaust Research

References

External links 
 Prof. Daniel Blatman at the Hebrew University of Jerusalem
 Daniel Blatman at Haaretz

Living people
1953 births
Historians of the Holocaust
Israeli historians